Coffey County (county code CF) is a county located in Eastern Kansas. As of the 2020 census, the county population was 8,360. Its county seat and most populous city is Burlington.

History

Early history

For many millennia, the Great Plains of North America was inhabited by nomadic Native Americans.  From the 16th century to 18th century, the Kingdom of France claimed ownership of large parts of North America.  In 1762, after the French and Indian War, France secretly ceded New France to Spain, per the Treaty of Fontainebleau.

19th century
In 1802, Spain returned most of the land to France, but keeping title to about 7,500 square miles.  In 1803, most of the land for modern day Kansas was acquired by the United States from France as part of the 828,000 square mile Louisiana Purchase for 2.83 cents per acre.

In 1854, the Kansas Territory was organized, then in 1861 Kansas became the 34th U.S. state.  In 1855, Coffey County was established.

Geography

Adjacent counties
 Osage County (north)
 Franklin County (northeast)
 Anderson County (east)
 Allen County (southeast)
 Woodson County (south)
 Greenwood County (southwest)
 Lyon County (northwest)

Major highways
Sources:  National Atlas, U.S. Census Bureau
 Interstate 35
 U.S. Route 50
 U.S. Route 75
 K-31
 K-58

National protected area
 Flint Hills National Wildlife Refuge (part)

Demographics

 

As of the 2000 census, there were 8,865 people, 3,489 households, and 2,477 families residing in the county.  The population density was 14 people per square mile (5/km2).  There were 3,876 housing units at an average density of 6 per square mile (2/km2).  The racial makeup of the county was 96.95% White, 0.25% Black or African American, 0.52% Native American, 0.34% Asian, 0.01% Pacific Islander, 0.50% from other races, and 1.43% from two or more races. Hispanic or Latino of any race were 1.55% of the population.

There were 3,489 households, out of which 33.20% had children under the age of 18 living with them, 60.70% were married couples living together, 6.90% had a female householder with no husband present, and 29.00% were non-families. 26.00% of all households were made up of individuals, and 12.60% had someone living alone who was 65 years of age or older.  The average household size was 2.49 and the average family size was 2.99.

In the county, the population was spread out, with 26.80% under the age of 18, 6.50% from 18 to 24, 26.40% from 25 to 44, 24.00% from 45 to 64, and 16.20% who were 65 years of age or older.  The median age was 39 years. For every 100 females there were 96.20 males.  For every 100 females age 18 and over, there were 92.50 males.

The median income for a household in the county was $37,839, and the median income for a family was $44,912. Males had a median income of $31,356 versus $20,666 for females. The per capita income for the county was $18,337.  About 5.00% of families and 6.60% of the population were below the poverty line, including 5.00% of those under age 18 and 9.80% of those age 65 or over.

Government

Presidential elections

Laws
Following amendment to the Kansas Constitution in 1986, Coffey County remained a prohibition, or "dry", county until 2004, when voters approved the sale of alcoholic liquor by the individual drink with a 30 percent food sales requirement.

Education

Unified school districts
 Lebo-Waverly USD 243
 Burlington USD 244
 LeRoy-Gridley USD 245 (Southern Coffey County)

Communities

Cities
 Burlington
 Gridley
 Lebo
 LeRoy
 New Strawn
 Waverly

Unincorporated communities
 Agricola
 Aliceville
 Halls Summit
 Ottumwa
 Sharpe

Townships
Coffey County is divided into fourteen townships.  The city of Burlington is considered governmentally independent and is excluded from the census figures for the townships.  In the following table, the population center is the largest city (or cities) included in that township's population total, if it is of a significant size.

Notable people
 Alan L. Hart (1890–1962), transgender physician, radiologist, tuberculosis researcher, writer, and novelist

See also

References

Further reading

 Standard Atlas of Coffey County, Kansas; Geo. A. Ogle & Co; 69 pages; 1919.
 Plat Book of Coffey County, Kansas; North West Publishing Co; 40 pages; 1901.
 An Illustrated Historical Atlas of Coffey County, Kansas; Edwards Brothers; 44 pages; 1878.

External links

County
 
 Coffey County - Directory of Public Officials
Maps
 Coffey County Maps: Current, Historic, KDOT
 Kansas Highway Maps: Current, Historic, KDOT
 Kansas Railroad Maps: Current, 1996, 1915, KDOT and Kansas Historical Society

 
Kansas counties
1855 establishments in Kansas Territory